The US Regional Arts Organizations (US RAO) are six not-for-profit entities created to encourage development of the arts and to support arts programs on a regional basis. Funded by the National Endowment for the Arts, membership dues, and various enterprises, these organizations, which include Arts Midwest, Mid-America Arts Alliance, Mid Atlantic Arts Foundation, New England Foundation for the Arts, Southern Arts Federation, and the Western States Arts Federation (WESTAF), provide technical assistance to their member state arts agencies, support and promote artists and arts organizations, and develop and manage arts initiatives on local, regional, national and international levels.

External links
US Regional Arts Organizations
Arts Midwest
Mid-America Arts Alliance
Mid Atlantic Arts Foundation
New England Foundation for the Arts 
Southern Arts Federation
WESTAF 

Arts organizations based in the United States
Non-profit organizations based in the United States